Pavlovsky District  is an administrative and municipal district (raion), one of the twenty-one in Ulyanovsk Oblast, Russia. It is located in the southwest of the oblast. Its administrative center is the urban locality (a work settlement) of Pavlovka. Population: 15,109 (2010 Census);  The population of Pavlovka accounts for 37.2% of the district's total population.

References

Notes

Sources

Districts of Ulyanovsk Oblast